Marranj is an Australian Aboriginal language, a dialect continuum consisting of Maranunggu (Merranunggu, Marranj Warrgat), Menhthe, and Emmi.

Phonology

Consonants 

 Voiceless stop sounds /p, t, t̠ʲ, k/ may also fluctuate to voiced sounds [b, d, d̠ʲ, ɡ] when in intervocalic, post-nasal and post-liquid positions.
 /t/ can also freely be realized as a fricative [θ] in word-initial positions, and when heard as [d], it can also be heard as [ð] when after /n/ and in intervocalic positions.
 Sounds /m, n/ can also occur as geminated [mː, nː]

Vowels

References

Tryon, Darrell T. An introduction of Maranungku (Northern Australia). B-15, x + 121 pages. Pacific Linguistics, The Australian National University, 1970.

External links 
 Merranunggu at the Dalylanguages.org website.
 Menthe at the Dalylanguages.org website.
 Emmi at the Dalylanguages.org website.
 PARADISEC archive of open-access Emmi and Menhthe recordings

Western Daly languages
Endangered indigenous Australian languages in the Northern Territory